Murderaz or Mur Deraz or Mowr Deraz may refer to various places in Iran:
 Mowr Deraz, Kavar, Fars Province
 Murderaz, Sepidan, Fars Province
 Mur Deraz, Dishmok, Kohgiluyeh County, Kohgiluyeh and Boyer-Ahmad Province
 Murderaz-e Olya, Kohgiluyeh and Boyer-Ahmad Province
 Murderaz-e Rahbar, Kohgiluyeh and Boyer-Ahmad Province
 Murderaz-e Sofla, Kohgiluyeh and Boyer-Ahmad Province
 Murderaz-e Vosta, Kohgiluyeh and Boyer-Ahmad Province